The list of reportedly haunted locations throughout the world, that are locations said to be haunted by ghosts or other supernatural beings, including demons. Reports of haunted locations are part of ghostlore, which is a form of folklore.

Argentina

 Cinco Saltos in Río Negro has been reported to have a number of ghosts, most of them reportedly the result of witchcraft. In 2009, an intact corpse of an 8- to 12-year-old girl who had died in the 1930s was found in a cemetery ossuary.

Australia

 Ararat Lunatic Asylum, or Aradale, is the largest abandoned lunatic asylum in Ararat. Opened in 1867, Aradale was reserved for many of the incurable mental patients in Victoria during the 1800s. An estimated 13,000 people died here during 140 years of operation.
 Beechworth Lunatic Asylum in Beechworth, Victoria is reportedly haunted by several ghosts of departed patients. Open from 1867 to 1995, it has appeared in several books, television shows, and documentaries, including A.C.T. Paranormal. Ghost tours run nightly.

 Dreamworld is a theme park in Coomera, Queensland. One building inside the grounds of the theme park, where the reality television series Big Brother Australia is produced, has been reported to be haunted since the show's first season in 2001. Numerous production staff claim to have witnessed the presence of a young girl, as well as a child's voice and fog appearing late at night and early in the morning.
The Hotel Kurrajong in Canberra is said to be haunted by the ghost of former Prime Minister Ben Chifley, who died there in 1951. Some reports have Chifley pointing towards Old Parliament House, another location said to be haunted.
Monte Cristo Homestead in Junee, New South Wales was the site of seven deaths during the 1800s, and is reported to be the most haunted house in Australia. Various ghost groups have reported sightings there.
 North Head Quarantine Station in Manly, New South Wales housed victims of a number of diseases including smallpox and the Spanish flu between 1833 and 1984. It was the site of over 500 deaths. A number of ghost tours are run on the grounds, which includes a large cemetery.
The Princess Theatre Melbourne  has reported several ghosts since the building opened in 1886. The theatre's best known "inhabitant" is Frederick Baker, whose stage name was Frederick Federici, a talented bass-baritone singer who died during March 1888 whilst singing the role of Mephistopheles in Faust – and who was seen by the rest of the cast taking his bows with them soon thereafter. For years the theater kept a seat vacant in the dress circle for Federici (only ceasing the practice on economic grounds), and his appearance in the dress circle during rehearsals for a new show is considered a good omen.

Bangladesh

 Dhaka Airport Road: The segment of the road between Nikunjo and Biman office is reported by believers to be haunted by a lady at night, supposedly causing accidents.
 Dhaka Golf Heights, Banani, Dhaka: Claimed by believers to be haunted by a crying baby, and feelings of being watched are reported.
 Under-construction apartment in Old DOHS, Banani, Dhaka: Said to have ties to Satanism. Lanes 4 and 5 are reputed to have been built on top of graves.
 Purbo Nayatola Rail Crossing, Dhaka: Reported by believers to be haunted by a woman frantically looking for her missing infant.
 Shahidullah Hall Pond, Dhaka: The old pond adjoining Shahidullah Hall at Dhaka University campus is believed to be haunted by people who drowned in the pond.

 Farmhouse in Comilla: A huge farmhouse in Comilla is reported to be haunted by black shadows assaulting people at night.
 Baridhara Diplomatic zone Road 13, Dhaka: Claimed by believers to be haunted by a crying baby, and feelings of being watched are reported.

Barbados

Chase Vault is a burial vault in the cemetery of the Christ Church Parish Church in Oistins, Christ Church, Barbados best known for a widespread but unverified legend of "mysterious moving coffins". According to the story, each time the heavily sealed vault was opened during the early 19th century for burial of a family member, all of the lead coffins had changed position. The facts of the story are unverified, and skeptics call the tale "historically dubious." The tale appears to have originated from anecdotes told by Thomas H. Orderson, Rector of Christ Church during the 1800s, and subsequently repeated in James Edward Alexander's 1833 Transatlantic Sketches.

Brazil

 The Joelma Building (now the Praça da Bandeira Building) in São Paulo is allegedly haunted by victims of the fire that started on 1 February 1974, after an air conditioning unit on the twelfth floor overheated; centered on the "Mystery of the Thirteen Souls", individuals who died within an elevator as they were trying to escape the fire, and are haunting the building.

Cambodia
Kampong Chhnang: The famous "ghost house" in Cambodia.
S-21 Prison: This infamous detention center is haunted by the victims of the Cambodian Genocide.

Canada

China

Colombia

Czech Republic

Zvíkov Castle: Until 1597 there are stories about a Zvíkovský Rarášek (Rarach is a supernatural being common in Slavic folklore, similar to an imp or trickster) which haunts people in the ancient tower, Markomanka. This tower has stones engraved with unknown symbols, and was built during the Marcomanni rule over Bohemia, in the 1st century BC and 2nd century AD. It was integrated into Zvíkov castle hundreds of years later. Strange events occur here frequently, including weird photos, technical problems, unpredictable behaviour of animals, spontaneous extinguishing of fires, electromagnetic anomalies, and the presence of ghosts. In Czech media it's a popular subject of investigation. Other areas of the castle are also haunted; it is said to be dangerous to sleep in the main tower, as anyone who does supposedly dies within a year. Another monster common in Czech culture, fire hounds are also part of the myths surrounding the castle. It is said that these spectral dogs (in some accounts they are depicted with burning eyes) are guarding a hidden tunnel underneath Zvíkov.

Egypt

Baron Empain Palace: Tourists have reportedly heard voices throughout the palace late at night. Guards and police have reported seeing ghostly apparitions of people who were once residents of the palace, wandering the outside lawn at midnight.
Farafra Desert: The ghost of Akhenaten is said to wander the Farafra Desert (also known as the White Desert) of Egypt, reported by dozens of tourists and nomads. Legend says this is because Akhenaten abolished the Egyptian gods when he became Pharaoh, angering the religious followers and priests of Egypt. Upon his death, the priests are believed to have cursed him to wander the deserts forever as punishment.
Pyramids of Giza: A man in early 20th-century clothing has been seen by visitors, rumored to be the ghost of Howard Carter. Various employees and tourists have reported seeing an orb apparition of an Egyptian Pharaoh, floating away from the pyramids towards the Valley of the Kings.
Valley of the Kings: Eyewitnesses have reported seeing the vision of an Egyptian Pharaoh in the Valley of the Kings, wearing his golden collar, headdress, and riding a fiery chariot with black phantom horses.

Finland

Alexander Theatre in Helsinki is reportedly haunted by the ghost of an officer. The ghost moved to Helsinki as the tiles to build Alexander Theatre were relocated from Åland. Some have suggested that the officer died in the Crimean War and has been there ever since.
Finnish National Theatre in Helsinki is reportedly haunted by at least three ghosts - an unknown Grey Lady and the ghosts of actors Aarne Leppänen and Urho Somersalmi.
Haihara Manor in Tampere is haunted by The Blue Maid, former maid of the manor.
Nummela Sanatorium, an abandoned hospital in the village of Röykkä is told about rumors of paranormal phenomena, like the windows of the building show mysterious lights, and on the edge of the roof there is a woman who commits suicide by jumping down. There is also a rumor that the hospital might be haunted by the spirit of a girl who died there at a young age.
Omenainen, an uninhabited island in the municipality of Nagu (now Pargas) in the central Archipelago Sea, which was formerly as a burial ground, where the dead of the parishioners of Rymättylä and Nagu, who the church refused to bury in the blessed land (such as murderers and other sinners), were once taken to the island. In folklore, the island is considered cursed and ghost stories are told about it.
Svenska Klubben (The Swedish Club) house in Kruununhaka, Helsinki, is haunted by the Grey Madame. She is rumoured to be the former lady of the house who had an affair with her chauffeur. She is known to swing the chandeliers, play piano and walk around the house.
Villa Kleineh, a historical villa in Helsinki currently used by the Dutch embassy, reportedly hosts a ghost called The White Lady.

France

Germany

Berlin: The Reichstag building has been reported to be haunted by numerous ghosts of famous German politicians.
Heidelberg: The Hexenturm (Witches Tower) and the Nazi Amphitheatre are both said to be haunted by various ghosts.
Frankenstein Castle: Frankenstein Castle is a real hilltop castle in the Odenwald, overlooking the city of Darmstadt, and allegedly an inspiration for Mary Shelley when she wrote her monster novel Frankenstein. The SyFy TV show Ghost Hunters International aired an entire episode about the castle and testified it had "... significant paranormal activity".
Lichtenegg Castle: The ghost of a lady in a white dress is said to be seen standing in front of the entrance to the ruins at midnight. She will, usually, sit down on a flat rock covered with moss.

Schloss Nordkirchen: The castle was built between 1703 and 1734. According to the legend, at full moon and on certain foggy nights, a few people have reported seeing a luxurious carriage with stallions running through the grounds.
Wolfsegg, Bavaria, Wolfsegg Castle: This 14th-century castle was supposed to be a sanctuary for travellers. The folklore of this haunting originated from the 1500s, when Ulrich von Laaber hired two young farmers to kill his wife, Klara von Helfenstein, after discovering she was having an affair.  Soon thereafter, Ulrich and his sons also died suddenly. There have been reports of strange noises coming out of a cave area near the castle. Several expeditions into the cave, uncovering numerous animal skeletons, leading locals to decide the noises had come from hunters who were hiding their prey. While the cave noises might have been solved, this has not been the case of the haunting of the "White Woman" who is still restlessly making her rounds of the castle.
Würzburg: There is supposedly the ghost of a dead nun walking through the halls of Praemonstratenser Abbey. The ghost is said to be that of Maria Renata Von Mossau, accused of mixing herbs into everyone's food in order to bewitch them. The nun was taken to be executed only three days after her sentencing in court. She was first decapitated, and then burned and her ashes scattered. To this day, there are reports of her walking down the hallways and holding a bouquet of roses while picking off the petals, leaving a trail across the grounds.

India

Indonesia
Lawang Sewu: Dutch-built building which served as Administrative Headquarters for the Dutch Indies Railway Company. During World War II, when the Japanese troops took it over. Stories about torture and execution are the source of the haunted lore around it. The name Lawang Sewu translates to "Building of a Thousand Doors."

Jakarta History Museum: This building is located on the Old Town of Jakarta. It was built in 1710 and served as the city hall for Batavia, the capital of the Dutch East Indies. It opened as a museum in 1974. Folklore of its haunting are connected to violence committed under the colonial government.

Jeruk Purut Cemetery: According to local legend, the cemetery is haunted by a decapitated pastor.

Menara Saidah: A 28-storey building located in East Jakarta was once an office tower owned by local Arab-Indonesian businessman of the same name. The building was abandoned in 2007. Since the abandonment, there are numerous stories about paranormal activities within the building such as lady in red, a ghost sightings in the basement, mysterious ride hailing order and postal delivery coming from the tower, and mysterious job interview invite from the tower. The building remain a popular spot among local ghost hunters

Toko Merah: A Dutch colonial building located in Jakarta Old Town was built by Colonial Governor-General Gustaaf Willem van Imhoff and later owned by Chinese-Indonesian landlord Oey Liauw Kong. The building was known to be the site of 1740 Batavia massacre where the building was used for torture and killings at the time. Many locals reported the sound of screaming at night and sightings of Dutch lady in white gown.

Ireland

Charles Fort: Haunted by a 17th-century bride known as "The White Lady of Kinsale".
Charleville Castle: This castle is haunted by the third Earl of Charleville's younger daughter, Harriet. She lost her life after falling from the main staircase of this building at the age of eight, in April 1861.
Ducketts Grove: The mansion was owned by the Duckett family for 300 years, and is said to be haunted by a Banshee Ghost. On 17 March 2011, the SyFy show Destination Truth featured a four-hour live investigation for the season finale to find out the mystery of the ruins.
Kilmainham Gaol: This former prison has paranormal activities of lights which often turn themselves on and off in the prison's chapel, unseen forces pushing people over, apparitional footsteps, the feeling of being watched by spirits, as well as unexplained bangs and disembodied voices.
Kinnitty Castle: This Gothic castle sits on a plot that once housed Druids and Bards. It has witnessed a long and turbulent history, and is reportedly the home of many ghosts, the most popular of which is the Phantom Monk of Kinnitty.
Malahide Castle: This castle is haunted by Lord Galtrim, Sir Walter Hussey, the son of the Baron of Galtrim. Killed in battle on his wedding day during the 15th century, his apparition roams the castle at night, groaning in pain, while pointing at the spear wound in his side. There is also Lady Matilda "Maud" Plunkett. Her spirit appears to workers and guests as she did on the day of her marriage to the Lord Chief Justice. Maud would chase his spirit through the corridors. The third spirit is Puck, a jester who fell in love with Gerard FitzGerald's daughter, Lady Eleanor, who was detained at the castle by Henry VIII for inciting rebellions. One snowy night in December, Puck was found stabbed through the heart, still wearing his jester suit and cap. Before his death, he swore that he would haunt here until a master with a bride from the people ruled this castle. However, he promised not to harm any male Talbot who slept here. Numerous visitors have reported seeing the jester's face on some photos taken here. The White Lady is the fourth apparition here. The White Lady is a painting of a very beautiful, but unknown, lady which hangs on the castle's Great Wall. It is said that she would leave her painting at times and wander through the grounds at night. The fifth and final spirit is Miles Corbet. He was given this castle and the surrounding property by Oliver Cromwell. During the Restoration, Miles was made to pay for his crimes, and was hanged. It is reported that his apparition appears as a whole soldier in armour which then suddenly fall into pieces.
Montpelier Hill: The Stewards House, or Killakee House, was built around 1765 by the Conolly family as a hunting lodge. The house has a reputation for being haunted. Stories tell of a particularly large ghostly black cat. The best documented account occurred between 1968 and 1970 when the Evening Herald and Evening Press newspapers carried a number of reports regarding a Mrs. Margaret O'Brien and her husband Nicholas, a retired Garda superintendent, who were converting the house into an arts centre. During the conversion, tradesmen employed on the work site began complaining of ghosts. One night, a friend of the O'Briens, artist Tom McAssey, and two workmen were confronted by a spectral figure and a black cat with glowing red eyes. McAssey painted a portrait of the cat which hung in the house for several years afterwards. Although locals were skeptical of the reports, further apparitions were reported, most notably that of an Indian gentleman, and of two nuns called Blessed Margaret and Holy Mary who had taken part in black masses on Montpelier Hill. There were also reports of incorporeal ringing bells and poltergeist activity. In 1970, an RTÉ television crew recorded a documentary about the house. In the documentary, a clairvoyant called Sheila St. Clair communicated with the spirits of the house through automatic writing. In 1971, a plumber working in the house discovered a grave with a skeleton of a small figure, most likely that of a child or, perhaps, the body of the dwarf alleged to have been sacrificed by the members of the Hell Fire Club. The house operated as a restaurant in the 1990s before closing in 2001; it is now a private residence.
Leap Castle: Many people were imprisoned and executed in this castle, and it is supposedly haunted by several spirits.
Ross Castle: Guests often wake at night hearing disembodied voices and doors banging and shutting on their own. An apparitional spirit who roams here is Richard Nugent's daughter, Sabina. Her lover, Orwin drowned himself. A second apparitional spirit who roams here is Orwin's father, Myles "The Slasher" O'Reilly. This Irish soldier spent his last night here before dying in a battle in 1644.
St. Michan's Church: This church is haunted by disembodied whispering voices from mummies entombed in the vaults.
Shelbourne Hotel: This hotel is believed to be haunted by a seven-year-old girl from the 18th century, named Mary Masters, who had lived in the row of houses which once stood where the hotel is now. She died due to cholera during 1791. Her apparition roams the halls.

Italy

Colosseum: Known also as the Flavian Amphitheatre, was reported to be haunted according to some witnesses and researchers' testimonies. Visitors have described observing ghostly figures wandering the staircases. There have been reports of hearing the cheers and screams from a crowd while no sign of people in the particular section. The vaults were, reportedly, active by the spirits of gladiators waiting to fight, actors waiting to perform, and prisoners becoming prepared for execution. Several accounts of cold touches or pushes have been felt by both tourists and employees. Sounds of animals have also been heard within the vaults.
 Poveglia: This island, near Venice, was once a sanctuary to refugees during the Ottoman conflicts, and a hospice for sick patients throughout the centuries. It was detailed, from witnesses, haunted by many victims of the plague.  In 1922, the island became home to a mental hospital, where a doctor, reportedly, experimented on patients with crude lobotomies. He later threw himself from the hospital tower after claiming he had been driven mad by the spirits of the island. The island has been featured on the paranormal shows Ghost Adventures and Scariest Places on Earth.
Hotel Burchianti: It was a popular destination for celebrities during the 20th century. Guests have reported sounds of children skipping down the halls.  In the Fresco room, guests claimed they felt icy breaths down their spines.

Japan

Jordan
Petra: The residence of jinns, supernatural beings in Islam according to the Bedouin's saying.

Malaysia

Agnes Keith House: A house built on the site of a former house for British colonial officials. Reportedly haunted with a female apparition based on the experience by the house's former owners, the ghost is theorized to be the spirit of a known American author named Agnes Newton Keith. The house turned into a museum in 2004.
Amber Court: An apartment and hotel in Genting Highlands built in the 1990s. It has a notorious reputation as a haunted location with supernatural activities.
Bukit Tunku: Previously known as Kenny Hills, Bukit Tunku is a leafy area with British colonial houses. There's a report of a phantom motorcycle and a ghost of a woman standing in the middle of the road. Local taxi drivers usually refuse to pick up women and children at night.
Genting Highlands: Some apartments like Amber Court and Ria Apartment are reportedly haunted as well as First World Hotel, which 6,118 of its rooms are reportedly haunted due to gambling related suicides.
Highland Towers: After a tragedy that killed 48 residents, the remaining towers were reportedly haunted as claimed by the nearest residents who live not far from there.
Kellie's Castle: A Moorish revival castle located in Batu Gajah was built by Scottish businessman William Kellie-Smith as a gift for his wife. The building remained unfinished as Kellie died of pneumonia in 1926 before the completion of the castle. It was believed the castle was haunted by alleged Indian workers who died during the construction of the castle, the castle become one of popular spot among local and international ghost hunters.
Kinarut Mansion: A former German manor house in the Graeco-Roman style. Local population living near the area of the mansion ruins claims the place is haunted with "Hantu Tinggi", a type of Malay ghost in the form of a tall tree who is usually disguised as a normal tree in the heavily forested area. Other passerby claimed to have seen a fast moving apparition and hearing the eerie voice of pontianak, a Malay female ghost at night which were also supported by media crews who covering information about the mansion when they felt "something" was following them through their walk in the area.
Kuala Lumpur International Airport: The main international airport of Malaysia stands on former oil palm fields. Nighttime employees often see sightings and hear mysterious sounds. There are also reports of possession of airline staff and airport securities.
Masjid Kampung Tedong: A new masjid in Kampung Tedong, Melaka, built in May 2016. CCTV cameras captured two wooden boards that moved themselves as if a poltergeist was manipulating them.
Mimaland: Located in Gombak, Selangor, Mimaland used to be the largest theme park in Malaysia until it closed in 1994 due to a giant water slide incident that killed a Singaporean tourist in 1993 and landslide within the same area in the same year it shut its door permanently. Locals often reported paranormal activities around the former site of the theme park.
Shih Chung Branch School: The building that was once school in George Town, Penang was built during the British colonial period in 1880 and later closed its door in 1994. The school was once a private residence belonged to Hokkien businessman Cheah Tek Soon until it was later converted into hotels and finally a school building. During the Japanese era, the building was used as administrative building of Japanese empire and it also rumored that many locals were tortured and executed within the school building. It was believed that the ghost of executed locals still haunt the abandoned building as well as ghost of Japanese soldiers patrolling the building. Some ghost hunters reported that they have experienced psychological effects with some illness symptoms when entering the old building
Tambun Inn: Located in Ipoh, it is one of the top tourist destinations in Malaysia, and is reported to be haunted by many ghostly apparitions. Some of these accounts mention lights turning on and off, sounds of whispers and eerie cries, as well as a report of the ghost of an old woman spotted within the vicinity of the inn.

Mexico

Monaco

Witnesses have reported seeing Errol Flynn's ghost pacing aboard. Others have described the sounds of voices and laughter as if a wild party were happening on board.

Myanmar (formerly Burma)

Keng Tung: Kyaing Tong New Hotel was once a palace, it is now a reportedly haunted hotel.

Netherlands

Binnenveld mansion is a rijksmonument located in Huissen, in the province of Gelderland. The mansion is better known as the 'haunted house of Huissen'. This building stood in the front area during the Battle of Arnhem (a major battle of World War II). According to locals, this house is haunted.

New Zealand

Larnach Castle, on Otago Peninsula, is said to be haunted by at least one, and possibly two ghosts: that of Kate, daughter of the mansion's original owner, William Larnach; and that of Larnach's first wife, Eliza.
The Vulcan Hotel, in Saint Bathans, Otago is reputedly haunted by the ghost of a nineteenth century prostitute, "The Rose".

Norway

 Lier Sykehus: An old insane asylum situated in Drammen, Norway, where people claim to have seen ghosts, shadows and apparitions.

Oman

Bahla: A town located in Oman. In neighboring Gulf countries and Oman itself, there are rumors of Bahla being home to jinns, which are same as genies in English.

Pakistan

 The Koh-i-Chiltan peak: This mountain in Balochistan is described, according to a local myth and the legend associated with it, as being haunted by the "... spirits of forty babies."
 The Mohatta Palace in Karachi: Said to be haunted by ghosts of the British Raj era. Museum guides have reportedly seen various objects which have moved from their original place, or shifted about while guards have claimed to have "felt" the presence of certain spirits during the night.

Panama
Coiba: The largest island in the Central American region.  It used to be a prison for prisoners in the era of the dictator Manuel Noriega was a very scary place at night. Until a former stronger boxer, Roberto Durán said that he is not alone in the night.

Philippines

Poland
 Haunted house in Jeleń (part of Jaworzno city). Several families left this place, complaining of noises in the night and items thrown about by a poltergeist. The current owner offers adventure seekers an opportunity to stay in the house overnight (however, only groups of at least two people are accepted).
An unfinished house at Kosocicka St. in Kraków. According to the story known by locals, the house was located on a former cemetery ground. Construction started in the 1970s as an investment made by two brothers, but stopped after one of them killed the other in the house. After that the property was bought by another owner, who, for unknown reasons, committed suicide in the house at night, at the 3rd floor. Locals claim that ghosts appear in the house.
 The castle of Ogrodzieniec. Allegedly, the castle is guarded by a ghost of a giant black dog, as well as by three human ghosts. 
Abandoned hospital in Olesno.
Auschwitz concentration camp: This infamous concentration camp is known to be haunted by ghost of prisoners and victims of the Holocaust.

Portugal

 The Beau-Séjour Palace, in Lisbon, is said to be haunted by the Baron of Glória, who lived in the palace during the 19th century. Employees working at the palace report moving and disappearing objects and windows opening and closing abruptly. Visitors to the gardens also report hearing the ringing of non-existent bells.
 The Castelinho de São João do Estoril, in Estoril, is said to be haunted by the ghost of a little blind girl who accidentally fell to her death in a nearby cliff.
 The Quinta da Juncosa, in Penafiel, is said to be haunted by the Baron of Lages and his family. Suspecting that his wife was unfaithful to him, the baron reportedly tied her to one of his horse's legs and dragged her across the floor, killing her. After finding that she was innocent, he proceeded to kill his children and commit suicide. Locals have reported seeing the ghost of the baron several times over the years.

Romania

Russia

Moscow Kremlin: Said to be haunted by the Soviet leaders Lenin and Stalin along with other historical figures.

Singapore

Bedok: A planning area in the southeastern coast of Singapore, which is famous for its paranormal activities. There are numerous reports of suicide or murder-suicide around the residential areas. The most famous paranormal activity in the area is the ghost of a woman and her 3-year-old child. She allegedly died by jumping from the HDB (government high-rise flat), after throwing her child. But before she did that, she wrote "It's not over, darling" on the wall with her own blood in Mandarin. Residents claim they hear female laughter and wailing near the unit. 
East Coast Park: One night a couple was strolling around the area at night. It was at this tower where a group of thugs attacked them, knocking the boyfriend unconscious and killing the girlfriend after violating her. After this particular incident, there have been people claiming to have seen a female figure near the tower; while there have even been alleged screams of help resonating from the area.
Old Changi Hospital: The vacated hospital compound was popular with movie-makers after the Singapore Land Authority commenced short term rental of the buildings and is often listed as one of Singapore's most haunted locations due to its history. A former British military hospital, its reputation as a haunted location likely stems from the Japanese occupation, when the Kempeitai used its premises as a prison camp and reportedly turned some of the rooms into a torture chamber.
Pasir Ris Park: One of the white sand beaches of Singapore. It is a place where it has been reported that a haunted place is a hotspot where women commit suicide. Nowadays, it is very popular among the ghost hunters.
Lim Chu Kang Cemetery, Choa Chu Kang Cemetery and Kranji Cemeteries: A cemetery area that includes Chinese, Muslim, Hindu Cemetery. Taxi Drivers encounter strange and mysterious passengers at midnight and in the wee hours. Rumour has it after they pick their passengers they will drive to the cemeteries and get paid in either dry leafs, hell notes or the mysterious passenger, just disappears into thin air causing the driver to be stranded in the cemetery. However, if they are unlucky their passenger will reveal their true form (a ghost covered in blood).
Spooner Road: Surrounded by various HDB flats (government high-rise flat), These HDB flats were formerly used for the railway employees who worked at the former Tanjong Pagar Railway Station. After the railway station closed down, the flats were abandoned for a period of time. The flats were eventually used for low cost housing. However, current and former residents claimed they saw moving shadows, items moving, ghost sightings and heard unexplained noises.
Nee Soon Rubber Estate: Ranging from Pontianak sightings to unexplained noises, The Nee Soon Rubber Estate is currently defunct. However the trees were left there and the former rubber estate turned into a park. Residents claim to see Potianaks waiting on their balconies and doorsteps. Sometimes residents hear their name being called by the Pontianaks or just see Pontianaks staring at them.
Pulau Tekong: After the Japanese invaded Singapore, the Japanese beheaded many Chinese people and threw their remains into the ocean. After the war, the Singapore Armed Forces turned parts of the island into a military base. Many military recruits claim they see shadows, headless bodies and the famous dissembowelled recruit. Many other recruits claim to hear Japanese soldiers marching as well. 
Old Tampines Road: Although this road has been upgraded and many strange and spooky trees have been cut down, many Pontianaks have taken a liking to this road, many bikers report feeling someone else is on their bicycle besides them.

South Africa

South Korea
Gonjiam Psychiatric Hospital: Famous for its very dark past among ghost hunters in Seoul. This abandoned hospital in Gwangju, Gyeonggi is claimed to be the most haunted place in Korea. The once psychiatric hospital is home to many rumors of ghosts. Over 2.6 million people watched a horror film dealing with poltergeist phenomena in Gonjiam. Gonjiam hospital has since been demolished as of 28 May 2018.
Korean Folk Village: The most popular tourist attraction is located Yongin, Gyeonggi province has been reported to have witnessed Gwisin a vengeful ghost in the Korean folklore.

Spain

Barranco de Badajoz (Tenerife) - According to witnesses, various spectral apparitions take place there.
Casa Fuset or Casa de Franco (Tenerife) - In the property there are many cabalistic and satanic symbols painted on the walls. It is claimed that satanic rituals are performed in it, that shots are heard at night and psychophonies are obtained.
Museum of the History of Tenerife - Located in the city of San Cristóbal de La Laguna, in it the ghost of Catalina Lercaro appears according to legend, who according to legend committed suicide by throwing herself into a well of her mansion when she was forced to marry a man who did not love.
Palace of Linares in Madrid: Built between 1872 and 1890 for the Marquis of Linares José de Murga. According to legend this place is the most haunted in Spain. Supposedly, a little girl appears in the mansion, the Marquis fathered her with his sister and they murdered her in order to hide their incestuous relationship.

Sweden

Borgvattnets Prästgård: The rectory of the small village of Borgvattnet in Jämtland, northern Sweden, where there have been reports of hauntings since the early 1920s. On December 2, 1947, Bishop Torsten Bohlin revealed plans to "order a scientific investigation of the vicarage after several years of ghosts". The Church of Sweden confirmed ghosts and the village of Borgvattnet immediately became world famous.  Today, the rectory is open to the public, and people can spend nights in the house for a small fee (which benefits the village).

Switzerland
 The house located in Junkerngasse no 54 in Bern is haunted. About around 12 and 1 am, the windows open and a headless woman appears, laughing in a creepy way. She scares anybody who sees her.

Taiwan
 Chiayi Min-Hsiung Haunted House: Located in Chiayi City, it was once the residence of the Liu family. It is probably one of the most recognized haunted house in Taiwan.
 Grand Hyatt Taipei: The hotel that is located in Xinyi District, Taipei was believed to be haunted. The site of the hotel was believed by the locals to be a former Japanese concentration camp and believed to be haunted by former prisoners. It was believed that two big talisman-like paintings in the lobby was displayed on purpose to calm the spirits
 Sanzhi UFO houses: The UFO houses were constructed beginning in 1978. They were intended as a vacation resort in a part of the northern coast adjacent to Tamsui, and were marketed towards U.S. military officers coming from their East Asian postings. However, the project was never completed in 1980 due to investment losses and several car accident deaths and suicides during construction, which is said to have been caused by the inauspicious act of bisecting the Chinese dragon sculpture located near the resort gates for widening the road to the buildings. Other stories indicated that the site was the former burial ground for Dutch soldiers.

Thailand

United Arab Emirates
Al Jazirah Al Hamra: An abandoned fishing village near Ras al-Khaimah which is believed to be haunted by the presence of supernatural jinns.

United Kingdom

United States

Vietnam
300 Kim Mã in Hanoi is a building which was proposed to be the Bulgarian Embassy in Vietnam, but was abandoned for an unknown reason. After a murder near this building, the story of mysterious phenomenas including the ghost of a Western man is popularised across the nation. Now it is the property of Vietnamese government.
Côn Đảo: The unfinished stone bridge in the deep jungle named "Ma Thiên Lãnh Bridge" is called by the locals "Ghost Bridge", which is a bridge built by over 300 prisoners who suffered immensely and died under French control. One villager saw a long haired male ghost in a white shirt and black pants watch him while he was drinking with a friend, and then disappear. Another female villager said she saw a woman wearing a white dress standing on a bridge alone at the dawn, who she instantly recognized as a hungry ghost. Another woman says she came across the ghosts of two boys without a shirt, who forced her to give them dessert.
The Hui Mansion (now Ho Chi Minh City Museum of Fine Arts): One of the most mysterious places in Ho Chi Minh City, located at 97 Phó Đức Chính Street, District 1. People believe that the mansion is haunted by the ghost of Mr. Hui Bon Hoa's leprosy daughter.

727 Tran Hung Dao, one of the reportedly haunted buildings located in Ho Chi Minh City. It was built in 1960 by a Vietnamese businessman, Nguyễn Tấn Đời.

See also

Ghost hunting
Haunted house
List of ghosts
List of ghost films
List of Ghost Adventures episodes (includes lists of reportedly haunted locations mostly in the United States that have been investigated)
List of Ghost Hunters episodes (includes lists of reportedly haunted locations in the United States that have been investigated)
List of Most Haunted episodes (includes lists of reportedly haunted locations in the United Kingdom and Ireland that have been investigated)

References